This is a list of listed buildings in Dundee. The list is split out by parish.

 List of listed buildings in Dundee/1
 List of listed buildings in Dundee/2
 List of listed buildings in Dundee/3
 List of listed buildings in Dundee/4
 List of listed buildings in Dundee/5
 List of listed buildings in Dundee/6
 List of listed buildings in Liff And Benvie, Dundee
 List of listed buildings in Longforgan, Dundee
 List of listed buildings in Murroes, Dundee

Dundee